The Men's 10 metre air rifle event at the 2018 Commonwealth Games are being held on 8 April at the Belmont Shooting Centre, Brisbane. There will be  a qualification to determine the final participant.

Results

Qualification

Finals

References

Mens 10 metre air rifle